The 2001 LNBP was the 2nd season of the Liga Nacional de Baloncesto Profesional, one of the professional basketball leagues of Mexico. It started on July 31, 2001 and ended on November 29, 2001. The league title was won by Gallos de Pelea de Ciudad Juárez, which defeated Lobos UAdeC in the championship series.

Format 
12 teams participate. The first 8 teams in the regular season standings qualify for the playoffs. The playoffs have quarterfinals (best-of-5), semifinals (best-of-7) and finals (best-of-7).

Teams

Regular season

Standings

Playoffs 
 Finals (best-of-7, November 24 – December 2):
November 24, 2001: Gallos de Pelea de Ciudad Juárez 102, Lobos de la UAdeC 97
November 25, 2001: Gallos de Pelea de Ciudad Juárez 101, Lobos de la UAdeC 90
November 27, 2001: Lobos de la UAdeC 99, Gallos de Pelea de Ciudad Juárez 89
November 28, 2001: Gallos de Pelea de Ciudad Juárez 95, Lobos de la UAdeC 90
November 29, 2001: Gallos de Pelea de Ciudad Juárez 101, Lobos de la UAdeC 86

Gallos de Pelea de Ciudad Juárez wins the championship series, 4–1.

All-Star Game 
The second LNBP All-Star Game was played in Torreón. The game was played between a team of Mexican players (Mexicanos) and a team of foreign players (Extranjeros). The Mexican won, 119–116.

Teams 

Mexicanos
 Guillermo Cepeda (Algodoneros de la Comarca)
 Florentino Chávez (Correcaminos UAT Victoria)
 Cristian González (Dorados de Chihuahua)
 Enrique González (Gallos de Pelea de Ciudad Juárez)
 Eduardo Lin (Correcaminos UAT Matamoros)
 Daniel Macías (La Ola Roja del Distrito Federal)
 Víctor Mariscal (Lobos de la UAdeC)
 Alberto Martínez (Algodoneros de la Comarca)
 Arturo Montes (Tecos de la UAG)
 Erick Ortiz (León)
 Omar Quintero (Correcaminos UAT Victoria)
 Octavio Robles (Garzas Guerreras de la UATX)
 Felipe Sánchez (Fuerza Regia de Monterrey)
 Rafael Sandoval (La Ola Roja del Distrito Federal)
 Francisco Siller (Lobos de la UAdeC)
 Coaches: Jorge León Flores (Tecos de la UAG) and Adolfo Sánchez (Correcaminos UAT Matamoros)

Extranjeros
  Samuel Bowie (Gallos de Pelea de Ciudad Juárez)
  Quincy Brewer (Dorados de Chihuahua)
  Jeff Clifton (La Ola Roja del Distrito Federal)
  Romano Dees (León)
  Chris Doyal (Lobos de la UAdeC)
  Javier González Rex (Garzas de Plata de la UAEH)
  Carlus Groves (Fuerza Regia de Monterrey)
  Bobby Joe Hatton (Correcaminos UAT Victoria)
  Tito Horford (Garzas de Plata de la UAEH)
  Michael Johnson (Correcaminos UAT Matamoros)
  Alvin Mobley (Tecos de la UAG)
  Antonio Rivers (Fuerza Regia de Monterrey)
  Matt Watts (Algodoneros de la Comarca)
  Frank Wilkins (Garzas Guerreras de la UATX)
  Gerald Williams (Fuerza Regia de Monterrey)
 Coaches:  Oswaldo Paredes (Fuerza Regia de Monterrey) and  Antonio Segura (Algodoneros de la Comarca)

References

External links 
 2001 LNBP season on Latinbasket.com

LNBP seasons
2001 in Mexican sports
2001–02 in North American basketball